Carlo Cornara (1608 ca–1676) was an Italian painter of the Baroque period. He was born in Milan, where he became a pupil of Camillo Procaccini. He did not produce many works. He painted a St. Benedict for the Certosa of Pavia.

References
Cristina Geddo, Per una riscoperta di Carlo Cornara, “dilicatissimo pittore” del secondo Seicento lombardo, in “Artes”, 12, 2004, pp. 81–110 

1605 births
1673 deaths
17th-century Italian painters
Italian male painters
Painters from Milan
Italian Baroque painters
Catholic painters